Move Me Brightly is a music documentary film.  It contains live performances of Grateful Dead songs from a 2012 concert by Bob Weir and a number of other musicians, called "Move Me Brightly: Celebrating Jerry Garcia's 70th Birthday".  The film also includes interviews with some of the performers, other musicians, and members of the Grateful Dead extended family.  It was released on DVD and Blu-ray in 2013.

Move Me Brightly was directed by Justin Kreutzmann, the son of Grateful Dead drummer Bill Kreutzmann.  Many of the interviews were conducted by Luke Wilson.  The music was produced and mixed by Rick Vargas, with live mixing by Dennis Leonard and audio mastering by David Glasser.  The liner notes for the video were written by Mike Campbell, Benjy Eisen, and David Crosby.

Concert
On August 3, 2012, former Grateful Dead guitarist Bob Weir and a rotating lineup of musicians performed a five-hour concert of Grateful Dead songs at TRI Studios in San Rafael, California.  The show was called "Move Me Brightly: Celebrating Jerry Garcia's 70th Birthday", and took place two days after the 70th anniversary of Garcia's birth.  Many of the songs featured Weir on guitar, Neal Casal (from Ryan Adams & the Cardinals) on guitar, Jeff Chimenti (RatDog, Furthur) on keyboards, Mike Gordon (Phish) on bass, Joe Russo (Phil Lesh and Friends, Furthur) on drums, Donna Jean Godchaux (Grateful Dead) on vocals, and Jon Graboff (Ryan Adams & the Cardinals) on pedal steel guitar.  Also performing at the concert were Phil Lesh, Jim Lauderdale, Harper Simon, Cass McCombs, Sam Cohen, Josh Kaufman, Adam MacDougall, Jason Roberts, Jonathan Wilson, Chris Tomson, Tad Kubler, and Craig Finn.

Songs
The DVD and Blu-ray release of Move Me Brightly includes the following songs.

Film:
"Cumberland Blues"
"Goin' Down the Road Feelin' Bad"
"Mission in the Rain"
"Shakedown Street"
"He's Gone"
"Eyes of the World"
"Terrapin Station"
"Days Between"
"Franklin's Tower"
"U.S. Blues"

Bonus performances:
"Dupree's Diamond Blues" *
"Friend of the Devil"
"Tennessee Jed" *
"Ship of Fools" *
"Bird Song"
"New Speedway Boogie"
*Blu-ray only

Featuring
The following people are listed in the "featuring" section of the film credits.  They and others are interviewed in the film.

Bob Weir
Phil Lesh
Bill Kreutzmann
Mickey Hart
Donna Jean Godchaux
Mike Gordon
Jeff Chimenti
Joe Russo
Neal Casal
Carlos Santana
Josh Kaufman
Sammy Hagar
Perry Farrell
Mike Campbell
David Hidalgo
John Doe
Stephen Perkins
Dave Schools
Bill Walton
Jorma Kaukonen
Jack Casady

Setlist
The full set-list from the show is as follows: ( * indicates it was featured in Move Me Brightly DVD or Blu-Ray.)

References

External links

American rock music films
Concert films
2013 films
Bob Weir
Grateful Dead
2010s English-language films
2010s American films